Sir Cosmo Dugal Patrick Thomas Haskard  (25 November 1916 – 21 February 2017) was an Irish-born British colonial administrator and British Army officer. He turned 100 in November 2016 and died on 21 February 2017.

Life and career
Born in Dublin, he was the son of John McDougal and Alicia "Lily" Haskard. Educated at Cambridge University, he served in the university's Officer Training Corps, attaining the rank of cadet company sergeant major; he was commissioned a second lieutenant for service with the infantry unit of the Cambridge OTC contingent on 1 October 1938.

Haskard was commissioned a second lieutenant in the Royal Irish Fusiliers on 1 November 1939, attaining the rank of captain (war-substantive) by the end of the Second World War. He was appointed a Member of the Order of the British Empire, Military Division (MBE) in September 1945.

Haskard was promoted to the substantive rank of captain on 1 January 1949, with the honorary rank of major. He relinquished his reserve commission on 25 November 1966, retaining the honorary rank of major. Haskard served as Governor of the Falkland Islands from 1964 to 1970.  He was appointed KCMG in the 1965 New Year Honours.

References

1916 births
2017 deaths
Alumni of Pembroke College, Cambridge
British centenarians
British Army personnel of World War II
Governors of the Falkland Islands
Knights Commander of the Order of St Michael and St George
Members of the Order of the British Empire
Men centenarians
Military personnel from Dublin (city)
Royal Irish Fusiliers officers